The Athletics at the 2016 Summer Paralympics – Women's 100 metres T53 event at the 2016 Paralympic Games took place on 8 September 2016, at the Estádio Olímpico João Havelange.

Heats

Heat 1 
12:30 8 September 2016:

Heat 2 
12:37 8 September 2016:

Final 
18:54 8 September 2016:

Notes

Athletics at the 2016 Summer Paralympics